West Croydon is a combined railway, bus station and tram stop in Croydon, south London. It is served by National Rail, London Overground, Tramlink and London Buses services and is in Travelcard Zone 5.

The East London line, part of London Overground, was extended to the station in 2010.

Facilities

Railway station

The main entrance is on London Road, a short distance from the main shopping area. There are ticket barriers protecting the platforms. Trains run to London Victoria, and Sutton and from there to west Surrey and West Sussex.

By December 2009 station remodelling and tracklaying were completed for the southern extension of the East London line, of which West Croydon is a terminus. The space occupied by former bay platform 2, out of use since the Wimbledon service was withdrawn in 1997 and replaced by Tramlink in 2000, has been utilised to extend platform 3, the London-bound platform. Bay platform 1 has been retained. There is no Platform 2.

In April 2012 a new entrance was constructed in Station Road, allowing direct access to the railway station from the adjacent bus and tram stops.

Bus station and tram stop

A short distance from the main entrance is Station Road, where West Croydon bus station and tram stop are located. The tram stop is next to, but was for a long time physically separate from, the rail platforms, until the construction of the new entrance. All Tramlink routes use West Croydon, which is a single platform stop on the unidirectional loop around central Croydon. The bus station is a hub for London Buses, with 24 bus routes terminating or passing through. A new bus station opened in 2016.

London Buses routes 50, 60, 64, 75, 109, 154, 157, 166, 194, 198, 250, 264, 289, 367, 403, 407, 410, 450, 455, 468, and X26 and night routes N68, N109 and N250 serve the railway and bus stations.

History

From 1809 to 1836 the site was the terminal basin of the Croydon Canal. The canal was drained and became part of the route of the London & Croydon Railway, opening on 5 June 1839. In 1845 the L&C inaugurated the atmospheric system of propulsion; it worked for about a year but was not successful. On 23 September 1846, a fire broke out in a lamp room, severely damaging the station and destroying thirteen carriages. Damage was estimated at £10,000. The station was originally named Croydon; in April 1851 it became West Croydon.

The canal basin was served by a short private branch from the terminus of the Surrey Iron Railway (SIR) at Pitlake. From 1855 the station was the terminus of the West Croydon to Wimbledon Line, which followed much of the route of the SIR. This line closed on 31 May 1997, to be replaced by Tramlink. Platform 2, the terminal bay for the Wimbledon line, was trackless until 2008. Very little remains of this platform apart from a little section at the western end, as most of it was filled in to extend platform 3 to allow trains to stop closer to the stairs.

In 1912 the composer Samuel Coleridge-Taylor (1875–1912), who was a resident of Croydon, collapsed whilst on the station. This was due to overwork and pneumonia. He died at home a few days later.

During the 1930s the station saw major alterations and reconstruction. A new ticket office was built on London Road. The original station buildings, ticket office and entrance in Station Road were closed and are still standing, converted to a shop.

Services
West Croydon is Croydon's second station, used mainly by suburban trains: the main station is East Croydon, served by express trains to London and the South Coast and suburban trains.

Services at West Croydon are operated by Southern and London Overground using  and  EMUs.

The typical off-peak service in trains per hour is:
 4 tph to  via  and 
 2 tph to 
 2 tph to 

References

External links

West Croydon tram stop The Trams
East London Line extension  Transport for London

Tramlink stops in the London Borough of Croydon
Railway stations in the London Borough of Croydon
Former London, Brighton and South Coast Railway stations
Railway stations in Great Britain opened in 1839
Railway stations served by London Overground
Railway stations served by Govia Thameslink Railway
Bus stations in London